Gregory Brown may refer to:

Art
 Greg Brown (painter) (born 1951), American painter from Palo Alto, California
 F Gregory Brown (1887–1941), British artist

Music
 Greg Brown (folk musician) (born 1949), American folk musician
 Greg Brown (rock musician), original guitarist for the band Cake
 Gregory Brown, classical pianist and member of The 5 Browns
 Gregory W. Brown (born 1974), American composer
 Greg Brown, disc jockey for WLS-FM in Chicago

Sports
 Greg Brown (American football coach) (born 1957), defense coach for the Arizona Wildcats
 Greg Brown (defensive lineman) (born 1957), retired American football defensive lineman
 Greg Brown (Australian rules footballer) (born 1943), premiership player
 Greg Brown (baseball coach) (born 1980), American baseball coach
 Greg Brown (basketball, born 1972), American basketball coach and former player
 Greg Brown III (born 2001), American basketball player
 Greg Brown (footballer, born 1962), former All White and Socceroo
 Greg Brown (footballer, born 1978), English association football player
 Greg Brown (ice hockey) (born 1968), retired NHL athlete
 Greg Brown (sportscaster), announcer for the Pittsburgh Pirates

Other
 Gregory S. Brown (born 1968), American historian
 Greg Brown (businessman) (born 1960), CEO of Motorola Solutions
Gregg Brown (born 1972), English cricketer
 Gregory Brown, religious name of George Brown (died 1618), English Benedictine and prior